Arab Ughluy-e Olya (also Romanized as ‘Arab Ūghlūy-e ‘Olyā; also known as ‘Arab Oghlī-ye ‘Olyā and ‘Arab Ūghlū-ye Bālā) is a village in Sara Rural District, in the Central District of Saqqez County, Kurdistan Province, Iran. At the 2006 census, its population was 212, in 41 families. The village is populated by Kurds.

References 

Towns and villages in Saqqez County
Kurdish settlements in Kurdistan Province